Blut und Boden – Grundlagen zum neuen Reich (English: Blood and soil – Foundations for the New Reich) is a 1933 German short propaganda film that illustrates the Nazi concept of "Blood and Soil".

Plot
The film has both dramatic and purely documentary aspects, following a German farming family as they have their farm foreclosed on, are forced to move to the city and eventually return to farming in the German East. The documentary uses both animation and montage to present the case that the German farmer is suffering because alleged Jewish financial interests flood the market with foreign produce, refuse to lend money for the manufacture of farming equipment and foreclose on people's farms.

An unseen narrator encourages viewers to purchase only domestic goods and return to rural agrarian life. The depression-era trend of urbanization is condemned as a path to further poverty, decadence, and sub-replacement fertility. The film ultimately predicts Berlin's population dwindling to 90,000 by 2050, if immigration to the city had been blocked.

Production
In reversal of perspective, director Walter Ruttmann reuses footage previously used to glamorize metropolitan life in his previous film Berlin: Symphony of a Great City (1927), before the Nazi era.

Cast
 Jakob Sinn as a farmer
 Hertha Scheel as the farmer's wife
 Hans Stock as another farmer
 Carl de Vogt
 Heinz Berghaus

References

Bibliography

External links 
 
filmportal profile
Available online here, with English subtitles

1933 animated films
1933 films
Nazi propaganda films
German animated short films
German documentary films
1930s German films